Addicts: Black Meddle, Pt. II is the fifth full-length album by Chicago band Nachtmystium. It was released via Century Media Records in the United States on June 8, 2010, and by Candlelight Records in Europe a few days later. The recording took place in January 2010 at Volume Studios in Chicago, IL.

Mainman Blake Judd said this about the new album:
The new material is reminiscent of Assassins with more of a rock and roll edge over all. Our love for post-rock and industrial (a la Ministry, Killing Joke, etc.) is even more present this time around. We're hoping to make a record that will continue to push extreme music into uncharted territories.

The album artwork was made by Derek Lea, Jimmy Hubbard and Seldon Hunt. A  for the album was released by Century Media on YouTube on April 18, 2010.

All music was written by Nachtmystium, all lyrics written by Chris Black, except "Ruined Life Continuum" which features lyrics by Blake Judd and Chris Black.

Track listing

CD release

LP release

Production
Produced by Chris Black and Nachtmystium
Engineered and mixed by Sanford Parker
Mastered by Collin Jordan at BR Mastering, Chicago, IL

Personnel

Nachtmystium
Blake Judd – Lead and rhythm guitars, vocals
Jeff Wilson – Lead and rhythm guitars
Will Lindsay – Bass, lead and rhythm guitars, backing vocals
Sanford Parker – Synthesizers and effects
Jef "Wrest" Whitehead – Drums and percussion

Additional Musicians
Chris Black – keyboards, programming, guitars, backing vocals
Bruce Lamont – clean vocals on "Every Last Drop"
Russ Strahan – guitars on "Macrocosmic"
Matt Johnsen – guitars on "Macrocosmic"

References

Nachtmystium albums
2010 albums
Century Media Records albums
Candlelight Records albums